Nutcharut Wongharuthai (born 7 November 1999), better known as Mink Nutcharut, is a Thai snooker player who competes on both the professional World Snooker Tour and the World Women's Snooker Tour. She is the only woman known to have made a maximum break, having achieved the feat during a practice match in March 2019. She is currently ranked number one in the world women's snooker rankings.

Mink was World Women's Under-21 Champion in 2018, was runner-up to Reanne Evans in the 2019 World Women's Snooker Championship, and won her first ranking title at the 2019 Australian Women's Open. She won the 2022 World Women's Snooker Championship, defeating Wendy Jans 6–5 on the final black to become the tournament's first Thai winner.

As world women's champion, Mink earned a two-year card to compete on the professional tour, beginning in the 2022–23 snooker season. She and Neil Robertson won the 2022 World Mixed Doubles championship, defeating Mark Selby and Rebecca Kenna in the final.

Career
In 2018 she won the World Women's Under-21 Championship. In 2019 she beat defending champion Ng On-yee in the quarter-final during her run to the World Women's Snooker Championship final, where she was beaten by 12-time champion Reanne Evans.

In March 2019 she made a 147 break during a practice session, which was the first and only known maximum break achieved by a female player.

Wongharuthai was one of four women to be selected for the Women's Tour Championship to be held at the Crucible Theatre, Sheffield.

She won the 2019 International Billiards and Snooker Federation World Women's 6 Reds Championship, beating Amee Kamani 4–2 in the final.

At the Australian Women's Open in 2019, Wongharuthai and Ng On-yee were the only players to complete their qualifying groups without losing a frame. Wongharuthai then progressed to the final, still without losing a frame, registering wins over Kimberly Cullen 3–0, Carlie Tait 3–0 and Jaique Ip 4–0 to reach the final, against Ng. Wongharuthai won the final 4–2, gaining her first ranking tournament win.

At the 2022 World Women's Snooker Championship, Wongharuthai faced three-time champion Ng On Yee in the quarter-finals. Although Wongharuthai took a 3–0 lead, Ng came back to force a deciding frame, but Wongharuthai won the match 4–3 on the final black. She defeated Rebecca Kenna 5–1 in the semi-finals before facing Wendy Jans in the final. Although Wongharuthai took an initial 2–1 lead, Jans won four of the next five to lead 5–3. Wongharuthai then won the next two to force a deciding frame, in which the title was decided on the final black ball. Jans missed the black into the yellow pocket, leaving it over the middle, allowing Wongharuthai to clinch her first women's world title. Wongharuthai's victory gave her a two-year professional tour card, allowing her to join Evans and Ng on the main professional tour the following season.

At the 2022 World Mixed Doubles championship, the first staging of the tournament since 1991, Mink and Neil Robertson defeated Kenna and Mark Selby 4–2 in the final. They both received £30,000 for winning the title, the biggest prize of her career to date.

Personal life
Mink's mother was a cashier in a snooker club, and her father enjoyed playing snooker. Mink herself started playing at the age of 10.

She is known as "Mink," stating that "in Thailand we call each and everyone by their nickname because our traditional Thai names are too long and we don't have any Christian name like Western people. So we use nicknames instead."

Hi-End Snooker Club in Thailand sponsors and supports her.

Performance and rankings timeline

World Snooker Tour

World Women's Snooker

Career finals

Women's finals: 20 (9 titles)

Team finals: 1 (1 title)

Notes

References

External links
Player profile at World Women's Snooker
Nutcharut Wongharuthai at WPBSA Tournament Manager
Video of 147 Break by Nutcharut Wongharuthai

Mink Nutcharut
Female snooker players
1999 births
Living people
Mink Nutcharut
Mink Nutcharut